Hilda of Luxembourg may refer to:
 Princess Hilda of Nassau (1864–1952)
 Princess Hilda of Luxembourg (1897–1979)